Ambrose Kiapseni M.S.C., CMG (16 October 1945 – 20 December 2019) was a Papua New Guinean Roman Catholic bishop.  Kiapseni was bishop of the Roman Catholic Diocese of Kavieng since his episcopal ordination on 12 May 1991 until his resignation on 22 June 2018.

Kiapseni was born in Masahet Island, Lihir Islands, Territory of New Guinea, and was officially ordained a Roman Catholic priest on 7 January 1975.  He was a member of the Missionaries of the Sacred Heart religious order. He was appointed to Kavieng by Pope John Paul II on 21 January 1991.

Ambrose Kiapseni was awarded the title of Companion of the Order of St Michael and St George for services to the Roman Catholic Church as the Bishop of Kavieng in June 2009. The honor was bestowed to Kiapseni as part of the Queen's Birthday honour's list.

References

1945 births
2019 deaths
People from New Ireland Province
Companions of the Order of St Michael and St George
20th-century Roman Catholic bishops in Papua New Guinea
21st-century Roman Catholic bishops in Papua New Guinea
Missionaries of the Sacred Heart
Roman Catholic bishops of Kavieng